OpenIKED is a free, permissively licensed Internet Key Exchange (IKEv2) daemon developed as part of the OpenBSD project.

References

External links
 
 
 

OpenBSD
BSD software
Key management
OpenBSD software using the ISC license